The School for Husbands is a play written by Molière and originally performed in 1661 in Paris. It was the first of his full length plays, preceding The School for Wives by a year. The plot centers on the suitors of two sisters, each of whom is a ward of each of the two men. One suitor, Sganarelle, is controlling and overbearing of his intended wife Isabella. The other suitor, Sganarelle's older brother Ariste, treats his intended wife Léonor more as an equal. Ariste eventually finds success in his pursued relationship, while Sganarelle fails miserably, so much so, in fact, that he is unwittingly used by Isabella in seeking her preferred courter, Valère.

Characters
Sganarelle, 40 years old
Ariste, 60 years old and Sganarelle's older brother
Valère, in love with Isabella
Ergaste, Valère's valet 
A Magistrate
A Notary
Isabella, in ward to Sganarelle
Léonor, Isabella's sister, in ward to Ariste
Lisette, Leonor's maidservant

Audio Recordings

An hour-long version adapted by Lawrence Langner was broadcast on the NBC radio series Great Plays on April 2, 1938.

The L.A. Theatre Works released a production in 2010 on a double bill with The Imaginary Cuckold, both productions using translations by Richard Wilbur and featuring Brian Bedford, Juliet Mills, Christopher Neame, Moira Quirk and Joanne Whalley.

References

External links

Plays by Molière
1660 plays